Mirka is a Palestinian village in the West Bank, located  Southwest of the city of Jenin in the northern West Bank. According to the Palestinian Central Bureau of Statistics, the town had a population of 1,555 inhabitants in mid-year 2006.

History
Just southeast of the village (at grid 172/199) is  a site where sherds mainly from the  Persian era have been found.

Pottery sherds from the early and late Roman, Byzantine, early Muslim and Medieval eras have been found at the village site.

Ottoman era
Mirka, like all of Palestine, was incorporated into the Ottoman Empire in 1517.  In the 1596  tax registers,  it was part of the nahiya ("subdistrict") of Jabal Sami, part of the larger Sanjak of Nablus. It had a population of 9 households, all Muslims. The inhabitants paid a fixed tax rate of 33,3% on agricultural products, including wheat, barley, summer crops, olive trees, goats and beehives, a press for olive oil or grape syrup, in addition to occasional revenues  and a fixed tax for people of Nablus area; a total of 3,780  akçe.

In the 1882 PEF's Survey of Western Palestine (SWP),  Merkeh is described as: "a hamlet on the side of a bare hill."

British Mandate era
In the 1922 census of Palestine conducted by the British Mandate authorities, Merka had a population 142 Muslims, increasing  in the 1931 census to 167 Muslim, in  a total of 32 houses.

In the  1945 statistics,   the population was 230 Muslims, with a total of 4,396   dunams of land, according to an official land and population survey.  Of this, 546  dunams were used for plantations and irrigable land, 1,300  dunams were for cereals, while a total of  26 dunams were built-up, urban land.

Jordanian era
In the wake of the 1948 Arab–Israeli War, and after the 1949 Armistice Agreements,  Mirka  came under Jordanian rule.

In 1961, the population was  303.

Post-1967
Since the Six-Day War in 1967,  Mirka  has been under Israeli occupation, and according to the Israeli census of that year, the population of Mirka stood at 142, of whom 59 were registered as having come from Israel.

References

Bibliography

External links
Welcome To Mirka
Survey of Western Palestine, Map 11: IAA, Wikimedia commons 

Villages in the West Bank
Jenin Governorate
Municipalities of the State of Palestine